Katsina-Ala is a Local Government Area (LGA) of Benue State, Nigeria. Its headquarters are in the town of Katsina-Ala where the A344 highway starts. It is also the location of an important archeological site where artifacts of the Nok culture have been found.

Community
 
The town center is the location of one of the oldest schools in Nigeria, Government College Katsina-Ala, founded in 1914, and has produced many prominent members in Nigerian society.
The postal code of the area is 980. 
The community, which lies on the banks of the Katsina Ala River, a major tributary of the Benue River, is mainly occupied by Tiv, Hausas and fulanis. The major language of communication in Katsina Ala is Tiv

Archeological site

Terracotta statues were found at Katsina Ala in the middle of the twentieth century.
They include realistic representations of human heads, with some animals, and parts of larger statues.
The statues are similar to others found at Nok, about 209 km to the north, and are thought to have been made by people of the same culture.
The human figures most likely represented ancestors or spirits.
According to Bernard Fagg, an archeologist who undertook extensive studies into the Nok culture, the works at Katsina Ala constitutes a distinctive sub-style.
Statues from Taruga and from Samun Dukiya are similar, but have typical stylistic differences.

Iron working began at the site in the fourth century BC, somewhat later than iron working at Taruga.
Smelted tin beads have also been found on the site, some of which could be imitations of cowrie shells.

References

Archaeological sites in Nigeria
Local Government Areas in Benue State
Archaeological sites of Western Africa